Upākarma ("Beginning"), also called Āvaṇi Aviṭṭam, Āvaṇi Aviṭṭam, Janivārada Huṇṇime, Gahmā Pūrṇimā, and Jaṁdhyāla Paurṇami is a Vedic ritual practiced by Hindus of the Brahmin caste. During the ritual, men change a sacred thread and put on a new one.

Upākarma is conducted once a year during the shravana or Dhaniṣṭhā nakṣatra of the Hindu month of Śrāvana, when Brahmins change their upanayana thread with Vedic rituals, making offerings to the rishis who composed the Vedic hymns. The day, also called Śrāvana Pūrnima ("Full Moon of Śrāvana") in other parts of India, usually occurs the day after the Śravana nakshatra which marks Kerala's Onam festival. On the following day, usually coinciding with the Raksha Bandhan festival in North and Central India, the Gayatri Mantra is recited 1,008 times.

Samaveda Brahmins perform upakarma and change their thread on the third day of the month of Bhadra. Yajurveda Brahmins in North India and Odisha perform upakarma on the first day if the full moon spans two days.

Observance
The day on which upakarma is performed differs by sect. Students of the Yajurveda observe their upakarma at the full moon of the month of Shraavana (August–September; Aavani in the Tamil calendar). Rigvedic upakarma is observed on the day of Shraavana when the waxing moon is in the Shravana lunar station, and Rigvedic Brahmins change the sacred thread that day. Yajurvedic Bramhins in North India and Odisha observe upakarma on the first day if the full moon spans two days.

Legend
On the full-moon day of the month of Shraavana, Vishnu (as Hayagriva) is said to have restored the Vedas stolen from Brahma by the daityas Madhu-Kaitabha. After Vishnu created Brahma, he taught him the Vedas. When Brahma mastered the Vedas, he was proud that he was the only entity who had their knowledge. Vishnu created Madhu-Kaitabha from two water drops on a lotus, and told them to steal and hide the Vedas. The humbled Brahma prayed to Vishnu, who restored the Vedas.

Significance
Study of the Vedas begins in Shraavana with a upakarma and pauses in Magha with an utsarjana ritual, resuming the following Shraavana. However, it was found that six months was not long enough to fully study the Vedas. Brahmins began skipping the break, and studied the Vedas throughout the year.

Pardon is asked for studying the Vedas during the prohibited period, and for all sins committed during the year. Homas are performed, and the sacred thread is changed. The removal of the old sacred thread and the wearing of the new one are accompanied by ritual mantras.

References

Rituals in Hindu worship
Vedas